James Claude "Howie" McKenny (born December 1, 1946) is a Canadian retired broadcaster and retired professional ice hockey player.

Playing as a defenceman, he appeared in 604 NHL regular season games between the Toronto Maple Leafs (594) and Minnesota North Stars (10), including 37 playoff games for the Leafs, and was known by the nickname of 'Howie' due to a resemblance to Howie Young. Known for witty one-liners, McKenny once said of professional ice hockey that "half the game is mental, the other half is being mental".

After retiring from playing hockey, McKenny settled in Toronto where he began a career in broadcasting, most notably working as a local television sports reporter on Citytv from 1984 until 2010.

Junior career

Jim McKenny was born in Ottawa, Ontario. McKenny played with the Neil McNeil Maroons of the Metro Junior A league in 1962–63.  When the league folded in 1963, McKenny transferred to the Ontario Hockey Association's Toronto Marlboros who won the Memorial Cup in 1964. As a junior, McKenny was considered by many scouts as the second-best defenceman prospect after Bobby Orr. In later years, McKenny spoke openly of his personal life and career being negatively affected by periods of alcoholism developed during his teenage years.

Pro career
Drafted by the Toronto Maple Leafs in the third round of the 1963 NHL Amateur Draft (17th overall), McKenny had difficulty staying in the NHL early in his career and often played forward instead of his usual position on defence. He was called up from the Marlies to play two games with the Leafs in the 1965–66 season. He was given two other opportunities to make the Leafs teams in the 1966–67 and 1967–68 seasons but only played a total of eleven games. However, on February 24, 1968, he scored the game-winning goal in a 1-0 win over Boston, which was the second goal of his NHL career. He struggled to stick with the Maple Leafs for several years, attributed to a poor attitude, possibly his alcoholism and his antipathy towards the high-pressure style of coach and general manager Punch Imlach. He played in the minor leagues for the Tulsa Oilers, Rochester Americans, and Vancouver Canucks of the Western Hockey League. Throughout the mid-1960s with the Rochester Americans, young McKenny and veteran Don Cherry were roommates when on the road.

McKenny finally became a full-time member of the Maple Leafs during the 1969–70 season and became one of the Leafs top defencemen for eight seasons. McKenny has the sixth highest points total for Leafs defencemen, accumulating 327 points (81 goals, 246 assists) in 594 games, behind only Börje Salming, Tomáš Kaberle, Morgan Rielly, Tim Horton, and Ian Turnbull. McKenny was paired frequently with former Marlboro team-mate Brian Glennie, with offensive skills complementing the hard-hitting, defence-oriented style of Glennie. In 1974, McKenny played in the NHL All-Star Game. In 1971, he also appeared in the movie Face-Off as the skating stand-in for Art Hindle.

Near the end of his career, McKenny was sent down to the Dallas Black Hawks Central Hockey League (CHL) for the 1977–78 season, and was subsequently named to the CHL's Second All-Star Team. On May 15, 1978, McKenny was traded to the Minnesota North Stars for cash and future considerations (the rights to Owen Lloyd), playing in only ten games before retiring from the NHL.

McKenny played the 1979-80 season in Europe—in Lyon, France and Rapperswil, Switzerland with SC Rapperswil–Jona—before retiring completely from hockey.

Career statistics

Post-hockey
After hockey, McKenny returned to Toronto and began attempting to break into the broadcasting industry, selling advertising and volunteering on the weekends at CHUM-AM and CHUM-FM. He would soon land a gig as a colour commentator for Canadian-Italian Hockey League (CIHL) games at St. Mike's Arena, working Friday nights alongside play-by-play announcer Brad Diamond on local station CFMT-TV branded as 'Multilingual Television'.

He was then hired by Gary Slaight at the Slaight Communications-owned Q107 radio station to sell advertising and contribute on the microphone on a show with Scruff Connors and Gene Valaitis.

Throughout this time, McKenny supplemented his income with modelling gigs.

Citytv
In 1984, in the aftermath of the longtime Citytv sports anchor Jim Tatti leaving to launch Sportsline on the Canada-wide Global Television Network, thirty-seven-year-old McKenny was hired at Citytv, a CHUM Limited-owned, Moses Znaimer-run local television station in Toronto. In addition to filing sports reports, McKenny began appearing as in-studio sports anchorman on the daily CityPulse 6p.m. and 11p.m. newscasts. During their on-camera banter before and after the sports segments, lead anchorman Gord Martineau usually addressed McKenny by his nickname "Howie".

Over time, in addition to professional sports, McKenny decided to devote a significant portion of his CityPulse segments to the coverage of local Toronto-area high school sports as well. During the fall-spring high school sports season, this included the 'Athlete of the Week' feature celebrating a different high school athlete's exceptional performance; the segment would eventually become somewhat of a signature for the reporter.

While on vacation in Montego Bay, Jamaica during November 2002, 55-year-old McKenny suffered a heart attack following a workout. After being taken to Half Moon Clinic in Jamaica, the sports anchor was transported by air ambulance to South Miami Hospital where he underwent angioplasty. He has since been able to make a full recovery. In later interviews, McKenny talked about having to borrow US$70,000 from friends in order to immediately cover the U.S. airlift and hospital costs due to not having his Canadian medical insurance information on him.

The December 27, 2009 broadcast of CityPulse Tonight (11p.m. air time) was McKenny's last with Citytv as the Rogers Media-owned station decided to focus its sports coverage solely around the younger anchor Kathryn Humphreys. Despite having his employment terminated in late 2009, McKenny agreed to a deal to continue anchoring the sports package on the weekend newscasts for another year due to Humphreys' unwillingness to work the weekends.

McKenny, at the age of 64, did not pursue further jobs in broadcasting after leaving Citytv, and instead counselled alcohol addicts.

In 2013, McKenney was inducted into the Ottawa Sports Hall of Fame.

Personal

Alcoholism
McKenny struggled with alcoholism for much of his career in hockey and television, starting during his late teens and continuing well into his forties. He has been sober for over two decades. He now helps other addicts by working as a counsellor at the Canadian Centre for Addictions, based in Port Hope, Ontario.

Citations

References

External links
 

1946 births
Living people
Canadian ice hockey defencemen
Canadian television sportscasters
Citytv people
Ice hockey people from Ottawa
Minnesota North Stars players
Rochester Americans players
Toronto Maple Leafs draft picks
Toronto Maple Leafs players
Toronto Marlboros players